Rhagadiolus is a genus of plants in the tribe Cichorieae within the family Asteraceae, native to the Mediterranean region of southern Europe, northern Africa, and the Middle East.

 Species
 Rhagadiolus edulis Gaertn. - from Portugal + Morocco to Iran
 Rhagadiolus stellatus (L.) Gaertn. - from Britain to Canary Islands + Caucasus; naturalized in California (Sonoma + Napa Counties)

 formerly included
numerous species now considered better suited to other genera: Crepis Garhadiolus Hedypnois Hyoseris Koelpinia Leontodon

References

External links
 Flora of North America

Asteraceae genera
Cichorieae